Kevin Roberts may refer to:
 Kevin Roberts (businessman) (born 1949), executive with the advertising agency Saatchi & Saatchi
 Kevin Roberts (footballer, born 1989), English footballer for Chester
 Kevin Roberts (Australian footballer) (born 1939), former Australian rules footballer
 Kevin Roberts (Antigua and Barbudan footballer)
 Kevin Roberts (cricketer) (born 1972), Australian cricketer and former CEO of Cricket Australia 
 Kevin Roberts (priest) (born 1955), Archdeacon of Carlisle
 Kevin W. S. Roberts, British economist
 Kevin Roberts (politician) (born 1966), Texas politician
 Kevin Roberts (academic), American academic